Rutland and Melton is a county constituency spanning Leicestershire and Rutland, represented in the House of Commons of the Parliament of the United Kingdom since 2019 by Alicia Kearns, a Conservative. It elects one Member of Parliament (MP) by the first-past-the-post system of election.

The constituency was first contested in 1983. It has been considered a safe Conservative seat since its creation, continuing to elect a Conservative with a significant margin even with the 1997 national swing towards the Labour Party. Sir Alan Duncan did not stand for re-election in 2019.

Boundaries 

1983–1997: The district of Rutland, the borough of Melton, and the borough of Charnwood wards of East Goscote, Queniborough, Six Hills, Syston, and Thurmaston.

1997–2010: The county of Rutland, the borough of Melton, and the district of Harborough wards of Billesdon, Easton, Houghton, Scraptoft, Thurnby, and Tilton.

2010–present: The county of Rutland, the borough of Melton, and the district of Harborough wards of Billesdon, Nevill, Thurnby and Houghton, and Tilton.

The constituency was created in 1983 from the former seats of Rutland and Stamford and Melton. Initially, it covered all of Rutland and Melton borough and part of Charnwood. A boundary change implemented in 1997 saw the area of Charnwood replaced with part of Harborough district up to the boundary of the city of Leicester (for example Scraptoft).

Members of Parliament

Elections

Elections in the 2010s

Elections in the 2000s

Elections in the 1990s

Elections in the 1980s

See also 
 List of parliamentary constituencies in Leicestershire and Rutland

Notes

References 

Constituencies of the Parliament of the United Kingdom established in 1983
Parliamentary constituencies in Rutland
Parliamentary constituencies in Leicestershire
Melton Mowbray
Oakham
Uppingham
Ketton